This is a list of electoral results for the Electoral district of Greenough in Western Australian elections.

Members for Greenough

Election results

Elections in the 2000s

Elections in the 1990s

Elections in the 1980s

Elections in the 1970s

Elections in the 1960s

Elections in the 1950s

Elections in the 1940s 

 The Liberal candidate David Brand had won the seat from Labor at the 1945 Greenough state by-election.

Elections in the 1930s 

 Preferences were not distributed.

Elections in the 1920s

Elections in the 1910s

Elections in the 1900s

Elections in the 1890s

References

Western Australian state electoral results by district